The 2017–18 Louisiana–Monroe women's basketball team represents University of Louisiana at Monroe in the 2017–18 NCAA Division I women's basketball season. The Warhawks, led by fourth year head coach Jeff Dow, play their home games at Fant–Ewing Coliseum and were members of the Sun Belt Conference. They finished the season 4–26, 1–17 in Sun Belt play to finish in last place. They lost in the first round of the Sun Belt women's tournament to South Alabama.

Previous season
They finished the season 6–24, 3–15 in Sun Belt play to finish in last place. They lost in the first round of the Sun Belt women's tournament to Louisiana–Lafayette.

Roster

Schedule

|-
!colspan=9 style=| Non-conference regular season

|-
!colspan=9 style=| Sun Belt regular season

|-
!colspan=9 style=| Sun Belt Women's Tournament

See also
2017–18 Louisiana–Monroe Warhawks men's basketball team

References

External links

Louisiana–Monroe Warhawks women's basketball seasons
Louisiana-Monroe